The New Jersey Volunteers, also known as Jersey Volunteers, "Skinners", Skinner's Corps, and Skinner's Greens (due to their green wool uniform coats), were a British provincial military unit of Loyalists, raised for service by Cortlandt Skinner, during the American Revolutionary War.

Regiment formed in Province of New York
In 1776, American loyalist soldiers, formed the New Jersey Volunteers, which was raised in Province of New York, first, as three battalions and eventually as six, of 500 men each.

Garrison duty
The New Jersey Volunteers saw their first combat at the Battle of Long Island, during the British New York Campaign offensive and following the defeat and flight, of the Patriot forces, was assigned to the initial British garrison, of the occupation army, in New York City.

Campaigns
Brigadier General Cortlandt Skinner conducted regular operations, in the region north of New York City, in Westchester County, New York, between Morrisania and the Croton Rivers, which was known as the "Neutral Ground". Lawlessness and guerrilla warfare occurred between Skinner's "Skinners", marauders and their rivals, the British loyalist raiders, De Lancey's "Cowboys" who, both, stole cattle, looted, and gathered military intelligence, in the New York countryside.

One battalion, of "Skinner's Greens", another nickname, for the loyalist New Jersey Volunteers, because of their green, wool, uniform coats, was later sent to East Florida, assisting in the capture of Savannah, others served in the Battles of Eutaw Springs and King's Mountain, with a detachment, participating in the Siege of Yorktown.

On September 6, 1781, the 3rd Battalion, New Jersey Volunteers, took part in the raid, on New London, Connecticut, commanded by Brigadier General Benedict Arnold and fought at the Battle of Groton Heights.

Regiment disbanded and resettled in British Canada
In 1783, the disbandment of the New Jersey Volunteers regiment, occurred, after the British lost the war, in the loyalist settlement of Digby, Nova Scotia and New Brunswick, British Canada.

References

Crary, Catherine S. "Guerrilla Activities of James De Lancey's Cowboys in Westchester County: Conventional Warfare or Self-Interested Freebooting?" In The Loyalist Americans: A Focus on Greater New York. Tarrytown, NY:  Sleepy Hollow Restorations, 1975.

Kemble, Lieut. Col. Stephen.  Journals of Lieut. Col. Stephen Kemble, 1773-1789: And British Army Orders: Gen. Sir William Howe, 1775-1778; Gen. Sir Henry Clinton, 1778; and Gen. Daniel Jones, 1778, American Revolutionary series: British accounts of the American Revolution, British accounts of the American Revolution, Volume 16 of Collections of the New-York Historical Society for the year ...  New York:  Ardent Media, 1972.
Lossing, Benson J.  The Pictorial Field Book of the Revolution, 2 vols. Reprint, Rutland, VT.: C. E. Tuttle Co., (1851) 1972.
Shenstone, Susan Burgess.  So Obstinately Loyal: James Moody, 1744-1809.  Montreal:  McGill-Queen's Press - MQUP, 2001.   
Stryker, William Scudder.  "The New Jersey Volunteers" (loyalists) in the Revolutionary War.  Trenton, NJ:  Naar, Day & Naar, 1887.
Ward, Harry M.  Between the Lines: Banditti of the American Revolution.  Santa Barbara, CA:  Praeger, 2002.

External links
 Index to New Jersey Volunteers History - The On-Line Institute for Advanced Loyalist Studies
 4th Battalion, New Jersey Volunteers, Captain Samuel Hayden's Company, recreated unit

Loyalist military units in the American Revolution